"Buzzin'" is the first single by American alternative hip hop artist Shwayze. The song peaked at number 46 on the Billboard Hot 100 and number 37 on the Pop Songs chart. There are remixes by DJ Skeet Skeet & Cory Nitta which featured Wale, will.i.am, Villains, AC Slater, The Knocks, The Rondo Brothers, Classixx, and the Hanni Fresh remix which featured J. Rocwell and J. Conway. There is also a music video for this song. This song was also featured in an episode of Gossip Girl.

Charts

References

2008 debut singles
Music videos directed by Robert Hales
Shwayze songs
2008 songs
Geffen Records singles